Yuhua Shouzhi Wang (born 1966), is a contemporary Chinese American artist. In 2000, she worked as a professor in the College of Liberal Arts at Auburn University. Currently, she is the Lifetime Chairwoman of the International Art Museum of America. Dr. Yuhua Shouzhi Wang was recognized as an international first-class artist by New York Academy of Art.

Awards, honors, and achievements 

In 2013, President George Christophides of the World Federation of UNESCO Clubs, Centers, and Associations (WFUCA) conferred the title "2013 WFUCA" to Dr. Wang's artworks.

In 2019, Dr. Wang was recognized as an international first-class artist by New York Academy of Art in the United States.

On March 18, 2019, Dr. Wang's artwork "Pomegranates in Bamboo Basket" of size 27" x 18" commanded $1.27 million in Gianguan Auctions.

Painting style 

Dr. Wang's painting style combines elements from Eastern and Western art. Professor Stephen Farthing, a member of the Royal Academy of Arts in the U.K. has remarked that "Dr. Wang’s paintings may draw heavily on the traditions of Eastern art, but they present themselves as extraordinarily Western ideas and images", and that Dr. Wang's mastery is of exquisite magnificence and her paintings "reach across cultures to celebrate the space that exists intellectually and emotionally between representation and abstraction, between a fact and an idea."

Solo exhibitions 

 2019, Seeing Two Worlds in One Flower, Palais du Louvre, Paris 
 2019, Shanghai Exhibition Center, Shanghai, China 
 2019, Ratchadamnoen Contemporary Art Center, Department of Culture of Thailand, Bangkok, Thailand 
 2018, Dapeng Art Institute, Shenzhen, China 
 2008, Gold Room at the United States Capitol

Theme exhibitions 

 2021, Claude Monet and Yuhua Shouzhi Wang: An Exhibition of Water Lily Paintings in Dialogue, organized by the Art Who's Who Museum of Paintings in Dialogue, Los Angeles, California, the United States

Bibliography 

 World’s Highest-Level Color Paintings and Ink-Wash Paintings 
 Paintings of Yuhua Shouzhi Wang 
 Yuhua Shouzhi Wang Flower and Bird Paintings

References

External links 
 Courants d'art transfrontières-Une fleur deux mondes
 Art Who's Who Museum of Paintings in Dialogue

1966 births
Living people
Chinese women painters
American women painters
American contemporary painters
21st-century American women artists
20th-century American painters
20th-century American women artists
21st-century American painters
Auburn University faculty
American women academics